Brighton Heights may refer to either of two neighborhoods in the United States:

 Brighton Heights (Pittsburgh), Pittsburgh, Pennsylvania
 Brighton Heights, Staten Island, Staten Island, New York